USS Point Cruz (CVE-119) was a  of the United States Navy.  Originally named Trocadero Bay until 5 June 1944 when it was renamed after the Honiara suburb Point Cruz,   which was an important location during the Guadalcanal Campaign. She was laid down on 4 December 1944 by Todd Pacific Shipyards Incorporated, Tacoma, Washington; launched on 18 May 1945, sponsored by Mrs. Earl R. DeLong; and commissioned on 16 October 1945, with Captain Douglas T. Day in command.

Operational history

Following acceptance and shakedown, she conducted pilot qualifications off the West Coast from October 1945 to March 1946.  Thereafter she ferried aircraft to forward bases in WestPac. (Captain Donald S. McMahan took command 27 November 1946, serving until 22 April 1947 when he was replaced by Commander William A. Smyth.) She entered Puget Sound Naval Shipyard on 3 March 1947 for inactivation; was decommissioned on 30 June 1947 and entered the Pacific Reserve Fleet, Bremerton, Washington.

After the start of hostilities in Korea the ship was activated and recommissioned on 26 July 1951, with Captain Horace Butterfield in command. (He was replaced by Captain J.W. Davison in December 1951, and Captain C.C. Marcy became commanding officer in November 1952.)  Point Cruz departed Bremerton on 4 January 1953 after coastal operations and an extensive overhaul modifying her for use as an anti-submarine warfare Hunter-Killer Group carrier. During the transit to San Diego, Point Cruz was damaged in a severe Pacific storm and repairs required several months.

Based at Sasebo, Japan, Point Cruz patrolled the Korean coast in the spring of 1953.(Captain John T. Hayward took command in July 1953.) After the armistice, she served as base for a helicopter squadron that took part in "Operation Platform", airlifting Indian troops to the Panmunjom buffer zone to supervise the prisoner of war exchange. (The incident on which the television movie A Thousand Men and a Baby was based took place during Operation Platform.)

The CVE returned to San Diego in late December 1953, and after training and additional overhaul deployed to WestPac again in April 1954, under the command of Captain John T. Hayward. Captain Frederick J. Brush assumed command of the ship in May 1954. In the Far East the carrier served as command ship for Carrier Division 17 under Rear Admiral James S. Russell.

The ship returned to San Diego in November 1954, and deployed again on 24 August 1955 (shortly after Captain Brush was relieved by Captain A.R. Matter) .While in the Pacific operating with the 7th Fleet, she served as flagship of Carrier Division 15.  Point Cruz departed Yokosuka on 31 January 1956 and arrived at Long Beach, California, in early February for inactivation at Puget Sound Naval Shipyard.  Decommissioned on 31 August 1956, CVE-119 was placed in the Bremerton Group of the Pacific Reserve Fleet.  While in a reserve status, she was redesignated an aircraft transport, AKV-19, on 17 May 1957.

Point Cruz was reactivated on 23 August 1965 and placed under the operational control of the Military Sea Transportation Service (MSTS) as USNS Point Cruz (T-AKV-19) in September 1965.  Commencing service as an aircraft ferry for MSTS, Point Cruz provided logistical support for American forces in South East Asia.

Decommissioning
She was placed out of service on 16 October 1969, struck from the Navy list on 15 September 1970, and sold for scrap in 1971.

References

External links 

  history.navy.mil: USS Point Cruz
        navsource.org: USS Point Cruz
   hazegray.org: USS Point Cruz
 USS Point Cruz Association website

 

Commencement Bay-class escort carriers
1945 ships
Korean War escort carriers of the United States
Korean War aircraft carriers of the United States
Cold War aircraft carriers of the United States
Cold War auxiliary ships of the United States